The first season of La que se avecina, a Spanish television series created by Alberto Caballero and Laura Caballero, aired its pilot episode on April 22, 2007, to July 22, 2007, on Telecinco, a Spain broadcast television network. The season consisted of 13 episodes.

Cast

Main
 Pablo Chiapella as Amador Rívas
 Eva Isanta as Maite Figueroa Espinosa
 Carlota Boza as Carlota Rivas Figueroa
 Fernando Boza as Fernando "Nano" Rivas Figueroa
 Rodrigo Espinar as Rodrigo Rivas Figueroa
 Ricardo Arroyo as Vicente Maroto
 Beatriz Carvajal as Gregoria "Goya" Gutiérrez
 José Luis Gil as Enrique Pastor
 Eduardo García as Francisco Javier "Fran" Pastor Madariaga
 Isabel Ordaz as Araceli Madariaga de la Vega
 Adriá Collado as Sergio Arias
 Mariví Bilbao as Izaskun Sagastume
 Gemma Cuervo as María Teresa "Mari Tere" Valverde
 Antonio Pagudo as Javier "Javi" Maroto Gutiérrez
 Macarena Gómez as María Dolores "Lola" Trujillo Pacheco
 Jordi Sánchez as Antonio Recio Matamoros
 Nathalie Seseña as Berta Escobar Indiano
 Luis Miguel Seguí as Leonardo "Leo" Romaní
 Malena Alterio as Cristina "Cris" Aguilera
 Nacho Guerreros as Jorge "Coque" Calatrava
 Vanesa Romero as Raquel Villanueva
 Emma Penella as Rosario "Charo" de la Vega
 Roberto San Martín as Silvio Ramírez
 Fabio Arcidiácono as Fabio Sabatini
 Eduardo Gómez as Máximo "Maxi" Angulo
 Elio González as Eric Cortés
 Sofía Nieto as Sandra Espinosa
 Guillermo Ortega as Joaquín Arias
 Manuel Andrés es Julián Pastor

Recurring
 Manuel Andrés as Julián Pastor
 Pep Guinyol as José Luis San Cristóbal

Episodes

External links